Uyirullavarai Usha is a 1983 Indian Tamil-language film written, directed and scored by T. Rajendar. The film stars Rajendar, Saritha, Ganga and Nalini. It was released on 4 March 1983. The film was remade in Kannada as Premigala Saval (1984) and in Hindi as Aag Aur Shola (1986), and dubbed in Telugu as Prema Sagaram.

Plot

Cast 

T. Rajendar
Saritha
Ganga
Nalini
Radha Ravi
Vennira Aadai Moorthy
Manohar
Goundamani
S. S. Chandran
Selvaraj
Usilaimani
Gandhimathi
Savithri
Kalaichelvi
Chandra

Production 
The film marked the acting debut of Nalini as a lead actress.

Soundtrack 
The music was composed by T. Rajendar who also wrote the lyrics. For the dubbed Telugu version Prema Sagaram, all lyrics were written by Rajasri. The song "Indralogathu" was later sampled by Flying Lotus for "GNG BNG" from the album Los Angeles (2008).

Tamil

Telugu version

Release and reception 
Uyirullavarai Usha was released on 4 March 1983. Rajendar struggled to find a distributor for the film, with the trade blaming him of "going back to the M.G.R. era". Despite these criticisms, the film became successful at the box-office. Ananda Vikatan said the film's plus points were its songs and score. Kalki criticised the film for having a Oru Thalai Ragam hangover.

References

External links 
 

1980s romance films
1980s Tamil-language films
1983 films
Films directed by T. Rajendar
Films scored by T. Rajendar
Films with screenplays by T. Rajendar
Indian romance films
Tamil films remade in other languages